The olive-headed sea snake (Hydrophis major), also known as the greater sea snake, is a species of venomous sea snake in the family Elapidae.

Geographic range
It is found in the eastern Indian and western central Pacific Ocean in the waters off southern New Guinea, New Caledonia, and Australia (New South Wales, Northern Territory, Queensland, and Western Australia).

Description
Yellowish or pale brownish dorsally, with darker brown or blackish crossbars. Crossbars may be all the same width, or they may be alternately broad and narrow. White ventrally, with or without small dark brown spots.

Dorsal scales imbricate (overlapping), strongly keeled on the neck, weakly keeled on the body; arranged in 31–36 rows around the neck, in 36 to 41 rows at midbody. Ventrals 200–236.

Head moderate. Body stout. Rostral as broad as deep. Nasals shorter than the frontal, more than twice as long as the suture between the prefrontals. Frontal longer than broad, as long as its distance from the end of the snout. One preocular and two postoculars. Two superposed anterior temporals. Seven or eight upper labials, third and fourth entering the eye. Only one pair of small chin shields. Ventrals distinguishable, but very small, either smooth or bicarinate.

Footnotes

Further reading
 Cogger, H.G. 1975. The sea snakes of Australia and New Guinea. pp. 59–139 in Dunson, W. (ed.) The Biology of Sea Snakes. Baltimore University Park Press.
 Cogger, H.G. 2000. Reptiles and Amphibians of Australia, 6th ed. Ralph Curtis Publishing. Sanibel Island, Florida. 808 pp.
 Rasmussen, A.R. 1997. Systematics of sea snakes: a critical review. In: Thorpe, R.S.,\; Wüster, W.; & Malhotra, A. (eds.) Venomous snakes - ecology, evolution and snakebite. Clarendon Press (Oxford)/Symp. Zool. Soc. Lond. 70: 15-30.
 Shaw, G. 1802. General Zoology or Systematic Natural History, Vol. III., Part II. Amphibia. G. Kearsley. (Thomas Davison, printer.) London. pp. 313–615. (Hydrus major, pp. 558–559.)

Hydrophis
Reptiles of the Indian Ocean
Snakes of Australia
Reptiles of the Northern Territory
Reptiles of Queensland
Reptiles of Western Australia
Reptiles of Indonesia
Snakes of New Caledonia
Reptiles of Papua New Guinea
Taxa named by George Shaw
Reptiles described in 1802
Snakes of New Guinea